Mochammad Rio Agata (born 27 November 1999) is an Indonesian professional footballer who plays as a goalkeeper for Liga 1 club Persela Lamongan.

Club career

Persela Lamongan
He was signed for Persela Lamongan to play in Liga 1 in the 2019 season. Rio made his league debut on 10 February 2022 in a match against Persebaya Surabaya at the Ngurah Rai Stadium, Denpasar.

Career statistics

Club

Notes

References

External links
 Rio Agata at Soccerway
 Rio Agata at Liga Indonesia

1999 births
Living people
Indonesian footballers
Persela Lamongan players
Association football goalkeepers
Sportspeople from Surabaya